The Strigoceratidae is a family in the ammonitid superfamily Haploceratoidea, restricted to the lower Middle Jurassic, Bajocian stage, possibly derived from the Hammitoceratidae. The family was established and named by Buckman in 1924.

Description
The shells of the Strigoceratidae are compressed to oxyconic, with a narrow or minute umbilicus and simple or irregularly branched ribbing almost confined to the outer (ventral) half of the whorl sides. The sutures are moderately simple to complex, with a long umbilical lobe bearing a graded series of Auxiliaries.

References
 Treatise on Invertebrate Paleontology, Part L Ammonoidea, (L171), Geological Society of America and University of Kansas press, 1964.

Ammonitida families
Haploceratoidea
Bajocian first appearances
Middle Jurassic extinctions